Yoav Bear (born June 24, 1991 in Haifa) is an Israeli former professional cyclist.

Major results

2011
 National Road Championships
1st  Under-23 road race
1st  Under-23 time trial
2nd Road race
2nd Time trial
 1st Overall Apple Race
1st Stages 1 & 2
2013
 National Road Championships
1st  Time trial
1st  Under-23 time trial
 1st Overall Tour of Arad
1st Stages 1, 2b (TTT) & 3
2014
 1st  Time trial, National Road Championships
 1st Stage 2b (TTT) Tour of Arad
 3rd Overall Apple Race
2015
 1st  Time trial, National Road Championships
 2nd Overall Tour of Arad
1st Stage 2b (TTT)
2016
 3rd Time trial, National Road Championships

References

External links

1991 births
Living people
Israeli male cyclists
European Games competitors for Israel
Cyclists at the 2015 European Games